Nongnuch Sanrat (born August 26, 1983 in Bangkok) is a track and field sprint athlete who competes internationally for Thailand.

Sanrat represented Thailand at the 2008 Summer Olympics in Beijing. She competed at the 4x100 metres relay together with Orranut Klomdee, Jutamass Thavoncharoen and Sangwan Jaksunin. In their first round heat they placed fifth in a time of 44.38 seconds was the eleventh time overall out of sixteen participating nations. With this result they failed to qualify for the final.

Achievements

References

1983 births
Living people
Nongnuch Sanrat
Nongnuch Sanrat
Athletes (track and field) at the 2008 Summer Olympics
Nongnuch Sanrat
Asian Games medalists in athletics (track and field)
Athletes (track and field) at the 2006 Asian Games
Athletes (track and field) at the 2010 Asian Games
Athletes (track and field) at the 2014 Asian Games
Universiade medalists in athletics (track and field)
Nongnuch Sanrat
Southeast Asian Games medalists in athletics
Nongnuch Sanrat
Nongnuch Sanrat
Medalists at the 2010 Asian Games
Competitors at the 2003 Southeast Asian Games
Competitors at the 2005 Southeast Asian Games
Competitors at the 2007 Southeast Asian Games
Competitors at the 2009 Southeast Asian Games
Competitors at the 2011 Southeast Asian Games
Competitors at the 2013 Southeast Asian Games
Nongnuch Sanrat
Medalists at the 2007 Summer Universiade
Olympic female sprinters
Nongnuch Sanrat
Nongnuch Sanrat